Lineus is a genus of nemertine worms, including the bootlace worm, arguably the longest animal alive. Lineus contains the following species:

Lineus acutifrons Southern, 1913
Lineus albifrons Coe, 1934
Lineus albocinctus Verrill, 1900
Lineus albonasus Verrill, 1900
Lineus alborostratus Takakura, 1898
Lineus albus
Lineus alienus Bürger, 1895
Lineus anellatus
Lineus angulosus Korotkevich, 1978
Lineus arenicola (Verrill, 1873)
Lineus atradentis Korotkevich, 1978
Lineus atrocaeruleus (Schmarda, 1859)
Lineus auripunctatus (Grube, 1855)
Lineus aurostriatus (Bürger, 1890)
Lineus australis
Lineus autrani Joubin, 1905
Lineus bergendali Senz, 1996
Lineus bilineatus (Renier, 1804)
Lineus binigrilinearis Gibson, 1990
Lineus bioculatus Sundberg & Gibson, 1995
Lineus bipunctatus Takakura, 1898
Lineus bonaerensis Moretto, 1971
Lineus boutani (Joubin, 1893)
Lineus callaris Korotkevich, 1978
Lineus cancelli Iwata, 1954
Lineus capensis Wheeler, 1940
Lineus caputornatus Takakura, 1898
Lineus cinereus Punnett, 1903
Lineus cingulatus (Stimpson, 1855)
Lineus coccinus Bürger, 1892
Lineus collaris (Schmarda, 1859)
Lineus coloratus (Bürger, 1890)
Lineus copus Corrêa, 1958
Lineus crosslandi Punnett & Cooper, 1909
Lineus desori Schmidt, 1946
Lineus dohrnii (Hubrecht, 1879)
Lineus fischeri Senz, 1997
Lineus flammeus
Lineus flavescens Coe, 1904
Lineus frauenfeldi Senz, 1997
Lineus fulvus Iwata, 1954
Lineus fuscoviridis Takakura, 1898
Lineus galbanus (Bürger, 1890)
Lineus gesserensis (O. F. Müller, 1774)
Lineus gilbus Bürger, 1892
Lineus gilviceps Sundberg & Gibson, 1995
Lineus glaucus (Bürger, 1890)
Lineus grubei (Hubrecht, 1879)
Lineus hancocki Punnett & Cooper, 1909
Lineus hiatti Coe, 1947
Lineus hubrechti (Langerhans, 1880)
Lineus indicus Punnett & Cooper, 1909
Lineus insignis Senz, 1993
Lineus iota Joubin, 1902
Lineus islandicus Friedrich, 1958
Lineus kennelii Bürger, 1892
Lineus kolaensis Ushakov, 1928
Lineus kristinebergensis Gering, 1912
Lineus lacticapitatus Wheeler, 1940
Lineus lancearius Korotkevich, 1978
Lineus levinensis Korotkevich, 1978
Lineus linearis Montagu, 1808
Lineus lobianki Bürger, 1892
Lineus longifissus sensu Takakura, 1898
Lineus longifissus sensu Iwata, 1952
Lineus longissimus (Gunnerus, 1770)
Lineus marisalbi Ushakov, 1926
Lineus mascarensis Punnett & Cooper, 1909
Lineus mcintoshii (Langerhans, 1880)
Lineus molochinus Bürger, 1892
Lineus monolineatus Staub, 1900
Lineus nigrobrunneus Bergendal, 1903
Lineus nigrofuscus (Stimpson, 1857)
Lineus nigrostriatus Iwata, 1954
Lineus nipponensis Senz, 2001
Lineus obscurus
Lineus oculatus
Lineus orientalis Punnett & Cooper, 1901
Lineus ornatus Wheeler, 1940
Lineus pallidus Verrill, 1879
Lineus parvulus Bürger, 1892
Lineus patulus Isler, 1900
Lineus pictifrons Coe, 1904
Lineus picus Corrêa, 1958
Lineus polyophthalmus (Schmarda, 1859)
Lineus pseudoruber (Friedrich, 1935)
Lineus psittacinus (Bürger, 1890)
Lineus quadratus Korotkevich, 1978
Lineus ramosus Isler, 1900
Lineus rovinjensis Senz, 1995
Lineus ruber (Müller, 1774)
Lineus rubescens Coe, 1904
Lineus rufocaudatus Bürger, 1892
Lineus sainthilairi Ushakov, 1926
Lineus sanguineus  (Rathke, 1799)
Lineus scandinaviensis Punnett, 1903
Lineus schmidti Korotkevich, 1978
Lineus schultzei Senz, 2001
Lineus sowerbyi Senz, 2001
Lineus spatiosus Iwata, 1954
Lineus stigmatus Coe, 1951
Lineus subcingulatus Takakura, 1898
Lineus torquatus Coe, 1901
Lineus trilobulatus Korotkevich, 1978
Lineus truncatus (Hubrecht, 1887)
Lineus turqueti Joubin, 1905
Lineus variegatus Chapuis, 1886
Lineus versicolor Bürger, 1892
Lineus viridis (Müller, 1774)
Lineus viridis Saint-Loup, 1886
Lineus vittatus (Quoy & Gaimard, 1833)
Lineus viviparus Isler, 1900

References

Lineidae
Nemertea genera